Pettit Crater is a crater in the Amazonis quadrangle of Mars, located at 12.39° north latitude and 173.87° west longitude.  Pettit lies west of the giant volcano Olympus Mons. It is 92.49 km in diameter and was named after Edison Pettit, an American astronomer (1890–1962).

Gallery

See also 
 List of craters on Mars

References 

Amazonis quadrangle
Impact craters on Mars